Ram Waeerkar (died 26 February 2003) was an Indian comics artist for the series Amar Chitra Katha, based on Indian mythology, history, and folklore. He illustrated the very first issue, 'Krishna' in 1969, and many others later. In the 1980s he was an illustrator for Tinkle, a magazine edited by Anant Pai. Here, he was the man behind the art of such iconic characters as Suppandi, Pyarelal, Nasruddin Hodja, Choru and Joru and many more. Ram Waeerkar died in 2003, with comics on Chanakya and Vishwamitra as his last projects. His daughter Archana Amberkar has been an artist for Tinkle magazine ever since and his son Sanjiv Waeerkar too illustrated for Tinkle in the early 1990s.

Art Style
Ram Waeerkar's style is characterized with quick brush strokes and sharp profiles. He drew most of the Akbar-Birbal comics series.

References 

Indian comics artists
2003 deaths
Year of birth missing